Hafotty, Llansadwrn, Anglesey, Wales is a medieval hall house dating from the mid 14th century.  Described in the Gwynedd Pevsner as "one of Anglesey's classic small medieval houses", Hafotty is a Grade I listed building and a scheduled monument.

History
The original house at Hafotty was built of wood. This house is recorded as "Bodiordderch" ("the house of Iordderch"), and has also been called 'Bodarddar'. Anthony Emery dates this wooden house to the second quarter of the 14th century. Its original owner was Thomas Norres from Lancashire. In 1535 the house was in the possession of Henry Norris, Constable of Beaumaris Castle. By the 16th century, Hafotty had passed to the Bulkeleys, another prominent North Wales family, and had acquired its present name, meaning summer house, or summer dairy. Cadw records extensions to the house in the 16th century, and its re-casing in stone in the 17th. By the 20th century, Hafotty was in a state of some dereliction, but was restored in the 1970s and again in the early 21st century. The house remains in the possession of the Bulkeleys, although under the care of Cadw, and is occasionally open to the public.

Architecture and description
The Gwynedd Pevsner considers Hafotty "one of Anglesey's classic small medieval houses". Peter Smith, in his Houses of the Welsh Countryside, categorises it as a three-unit hall house and notes that, despite its "relatively modest" size, it was still a "house of status". Built to an H-plan, and constructed of rubble masonry, it is of two-storeys. Dendrochronology from tree rings dates the beams in the extension to between 1509 and 1553. The interior contains some notable medieval fittings, including fireplaces and window surrounds. The arch also has carvings of the heads of a Saracen and a bull, another Bulkeley family motif. Hafotty is a Grade I listed building and a scheduled monument.

Footnotes

References

Sources

External links
 

Grade I listed buildings in Anglesey
Scheduled monuments in Anglesey
Country houses in Anglesey
Grade I listed houses